Elisabeth Rosen is a Canadian actress.  Her career began in 1992, appearing in four episodes of both Neon Rider and The Odyssey TV series. She has appeared as a guest star in many Canadian and US produced TV series, including Stargate SG-1 and Caprica. She has also performed in many TV movies, such as The Eleventh Victim and The Hunt for the Unicorn Killer.

She is the niece of playwright and author Beverley Rosen Simons.

Filmography

Films

Television shows

References

External links 
 
 http://www.tv.com/people/elisabeth-rosen/ 

Year of birth missing (living people)
Living people
Canadian film actresses
Canadian television actresses
20th-century Canadian actresses
21st-century Canadian actresses